Mart is a city in Limestone and McLennan counties in the U.S. state of Texas. The population was 1,748 at the 2020 census.

Geography

Demographics

As of the 2020 United States census, there were 1,748 people, 634 households, and 450 families residing in the city.

2000 census
As of the census of 2000,  2,273 people, 832 households, and 550 families resided in the city. The population density was 1,692.0 people per square mile (654.9/km). The 934 housing units averaged 695.2 per square mile (269.1/km). The racial makeup of the city was 68.28% White, 27.54% African American, 0.48% Native American, 0.04% Asian, 2.46% from other races, and 1.19% from two or more races. Hispanics or Latinos of any race were 5.81% of the population.

Of the 832 households, 29.2% had children under the age of 18 living with them, 45.8% were married couples living together, 17.3% had a female householder with no husband present, and 33.8% were not families. About 31.9% of all households were made up of individuals, and 18.5% had someone living alone who was 65 years of age or older. The average household size was 2.53 and the average family size was 3.21.

In the city, the population was distributed as 31.1% under the age of 18, 6.6% from 18 to 24, 22.7% from 25 to 44, 18.7% from 45 to 64, and 20.9% who were 65 years of age or older. The median age was 36 years. For every 100 females, there were 85.4 males. For every 100 females age 18 and over, there were 76.3 males.

The median income for a household in the city was $26,603, and for a family was $33,203. Males had a median income of $26,750 versus $19,784 for females. The per capita income for the city was $12,721. About 15.9% of families and 20.8% of the population were below the poverty line, including 34.3% of those under age 18 and 7.7% of those age 65 or over.

Education
The city is served by the Mart Independent School District.

Photo gallery

Government and infrastructure
Texas Department of Juvenile Justice:
 McLennan County State Juvenile Correctional Facility (Unit I and Unit II) - unincorporated McLennan County, near Mart

Notable people
 Quan Cosby, former wide receiver for the University of Texas, player for four NFL teams; native of Mart
 Frankie Lee, soul blues singer; born in Mart
 Jesse Plemons, actor known for the TV series Friday Night Lights, Breaking Bad and Fargo; raised in Mart
 Cullen Rogers, football player for Texas A&M and Pittsburgh Steelers
 E. Donnall Thomas, 1990 Nobel laureate in Physiology or Medicine, who showed that transplanting bone marrow to save the lives of patients dying from blood cancer and other blood disorders is possible; he is known as the "Father of Bone Marrow Transplant"
 Cindy Walker, the Country Music Hall of Fame songwriter of "You Don't Know Me", "Sugar Moon", "In the Misty Moonlight", and other hits; native of Mart

References

External links

Cities in Limestone County, Texas
Cities in McLennan County, Texas
Cities in Texas